

Events 
April 10 – The Mozart family set out for London, where Wolfgang Amadeus Mozart meets Johann Christian Bach.
Autumn – Following the death of his patron Keyserlingk, Wilhelm Friedemann Bach leaves his post as organist at Halle.
date unknown – The castrato Domenico Annibali retires from the stage.
Carl Ditters von Dittersdorf becomes Kapellmeister at the court of Adam Patachich in Großwardein, replacing Michael Haydn and restructuring the orchestra of the bishop's palace.

Popular music 
The Temple of Comus or Every Gentleman and Lady's Beard, Brent and Lowe: Being Songs for the Year 1764

Classical music 
Johann Christian Bach – 6 Keyboard Trios, Op. 2
Michel Corrette – Carillon, ajouté à la Messe des Morts de Gilles
Joseph Haydn 
Symphony No.14 in A major
Symphony No.15 in D major
Symphony No.21 in A major
Symphony no 22 ("Philosopher")
Symphony No.23 in G major
Symphony No.24 in D major
Divertimento in C major Hob. XIV:4
Qual dubbio o(r)mai
Michael Haydn – Trumpet Concerto
Ignacio de Jerusalem – Matins for the Virgin of Guadalupe
Joseph Kelway – 6 Harpsichord Sonatas
Wolfgang Amadeus Mozart 
Violin Sonata in B-flat major, K.8
Violin Sonata in C major, K.14
Symphony No.1 in E-flat major, K.16
Johann Baptist Georg Neruda – 6 Trio Sonatas
Giuseppe Antonio Paganelli - Six sonates d'un goût agréable..., published posthumously
Johann Schobert – 3 Harpsichord Quartets, Op. 7

Opera 
Florian Leopold Gassmann – L'Olimpiade
Christoph Willibald Gluck – La rencontre imprévue
Pietro Guglielmi – Siroe re di Persia
Andrea Luchesi – L'Isola della Fortuna
Pierre-Alexandre Monsigny – Rose et Colas
Niccolò Piccinni – Gli stravaganti

Methods and theory writings 

 Daniel Bayley – A New and Compleat Introduction to the Grounds and Rules of Musick
 L'Abbé Duval – Principes de la musique pratique
 Jean-Philippe Rameau – Traité des accords et de leur succession selon le système de la Basse-fondamentale
 Valentin Roeser – Essai d'instruction à l'usage de ceux qui composent pour la clarinette et le cor
 Francisco Inácio Solano –

Births 
January 13 – Franz Lauska, Moravian pianist, composer and teacher (died 1825)
March 1 – Jeremiah Ingalls, composer of the First New England School (died 1838)
March 2 – Hélène de Montgeroult, composer and pianist (died 1836)
May 15 – Johann Nepomuk Kalcher, composer (died 1827)
September 11 – Valentino Fioravanti, composer (died 1837)
October 21 – János Bihari, Hungarian Romani violinist (died 1827) 
November 30 – Franz Xaver Gerl, composer (died 1827)
unknown date 
Alexander Campbell, musician and writer (died 1824)
Vincenzo Fabrizi, composer
probable 
Bernard Lorenziti, French composer (died after 1815)
Jan Šťastný, cellist and composer (died c.1830)

Deaths 
March 30 – Pietro Locatelli, violinist and composer (born 1695)
April 17 
Johann Balthasar Christian Freislich, composer (born 1687)
Johann Mattheson, German musicologist (born 1681)
buried June 6 – Wilhelm Hieronymus Pachelbel, German composer, son of Johann Pachelbel (born c.1686)
September 10 – Giovanni Antonio Giay, composer (born 1690)
September 12 – Jean-Philippe Rameau, composer (born 1683)
October 22 – Jean-Marie Leclair, composer (born 1697; murdered)
October 23 – Pierre-Charles Roy, librettist and poet (born 1683)
date unknown 
Josep Mir i Llussà, Catalan composer and maestro de capilla (born 1700)
Lorenzo Zavateri, violinist and composer (born 1690)

References

 
18th century in music
Music by year